"Mrs. Officer" is the fourth single from Lil Wayne's album Tha Carter III. Its lyrics explore the tension between criminal suspects and police officers by portraying a relationship between Lil Wayne and a female police officer; it goes so far as to reference the famous N.W.A rap song "Fuck tha Police" (though in a literal sense). The song features Bobby Valentino and Kidd Kidd, and is produced by Deezle. The Music video officially debuted on September 9, 2008 It was ranked the No. 25 Hip-Hop song of 2008 by MTV.

Background 
Rapper 2 Chainz, known then as Tity Boi, was originally featured on the song.

Music video 

The music video was shot in Miami, Florida, with Lil Wayne and Gil Green directing it. It is a continuation of the "A Milli" and "Got Money" music videos.

The video was released on October 31, 2008. The last verse of Mrs. Officer, with Kidd Kidd and Bobby Valentino, is cut off and replaced with the first verse from "Comfortable", another track off Tha Carter III which features R&B artist Babyface. Lil Wayne plays the lucky victim, being searched by the female cop (Tammy Torres) an hour after leaving the "A Milli" video shoot. In contrast, Bobby Valentino plays an officer, detaining several women. The "Comfortable" segment of the video is the continuation of "Mrs. Officer" where Lil Wayne and the female officer are living together and for most of the segment argue late in the night on an open street. This segment of the song also contains lines referencing and Beyoncé's "Irreplaceable". Cameos were made Birdman, and Young Money Entertainment artist Mack Maine, and Jae Millz.

Chart performance 
"Mrs. Officer" debuted at No. 16 on the Billboard Hot 100, making it the seventh song to chart on the Hot 100 from Tha Carter III. The song peaked at No. 16, making it Wayne's fourth top twenty hit on the Billboard Hot 100 from the album. It rapidly ascended the Hot R&B/Hip-Hop Songs chart, reaching No. 5, becoming his fourth top ten single on that chart from the album.

Charts

Year-end charts

Sales and certifications

References 

2008 singles
Lil Wayne songs
Bobby V songs
Cash Money Records singles
Songs about police officers
Songs written by Lil Wayne
Music videos directed by Gil Green
Dirty rap songs
2008 songs